The common rufous-nosed rat (Oenomys hypoxanthus) is a species of rodent in the family Muridae.
It is found in Angola, Burundi, Cameroon, Central African Republic, Republic of the Congo, Democratic Republic of the Congo, Equatorial Guinea, Ethiopia, Gabon, Kenya, Nigeria, Rwanda, South Sudan, Tanzania, and Uganda.
Its natural habitats are subtropical or tropical seasonally wet or flooded lowland grassland and seasonally flooded agricultural land.

References

Oenomys
Mammals described in 1855
Taxonomy articles created by Polbot